Serhiy Viktorovych Kokurin (1 January 1978 – 18 March 2014) was a Ukrainian soldier who was shot dead by a sniper during the assault on the Ukrainian military base in Simferopol. He was the first soldier killed during the Annexation of Crimea by the Russian Federation.

Biography

Serhiy Kokurin was born on 1 January 1978 in Simferopol, Crimean Oblast (Ukrainian SSR, USSR). On 28 December 1997 he pledged his allegiance to the Ukrainian people. During his military service Kokurin went from private to warrant officer and was the chief of his unit's logistics service.

On 18 March, Kokurin was killed on watch duty during the Russian assault on the 13th Photogrammetric Center of the Central Military Topographic and Navigation Main Directorate of Operations of the Armed Forces of Ukraine. According to the Russians, he was killed by a sniper, and a sniper from the same location also killed one rebel (Ruslan Kazakov) and wounded another. The Ukrainian government insists that the sniper was a soldier of the Armed Forces of the Russian Federation.

Kokurin was survived by his wife, son, and unborn child, all of whom relocated to Odessa.

References 

1978 births
2014 deaths
People from Simferopol
Deaths by firearm in Ukraine
Ukrainian people of Russian descent
People of the annexation of Crimea by the Russian Federation
Ukrainian military personnel killed in the Russo-Ukrainian War
People murdered in Ukraine